Here is one hand is an epistemological argument created by G. E. Moore in reaction against philosophical skepticism and in support of common sense.

The argument takes the following form:
 Here is one hand,
 And here is another.
 There are at least two external objects in the world.
 Therefore, an external world exists.

Introduction
G. E. Moore wrote "A Defence of Common Sense" and Proof of an External World. For the purposes of these essays, he posed skeptical hypotheses, such as "you may be dreaming" or "the world is 5 minutes old", and then provided his own response to them. Such hypotheses ostensibly create a situation where it is not possible to know that anything in the world exists. These hypotheses take the following form:

The skeptical argument 
Where S is a  subject, sp is a skeptical possibility, such as the brain in a vat hypothesis, and q is a knowledge claim about the world:
 If S doesn't know that not-sp, then S doesn't know that q
 S doesn't know that not-sp
 Therefore, S doesn't know that q

Moore's response 
Moore does not attack the skeptical premise; instead, he reverses the argument from being in the form of modus ponens to modus tollens. This logical maneuver is often called a G. E. Moore shift or a Moorean shift. This is captured clearly in Fred Dretske's aphorism that "one man's modus ponens is another man's modus tollens"   His response takes the following form:
 If S doesn't know that not-sp, then S doesn't know that q
 S knows that q
 Therefore, S knows that not-sp

Explanation
Moore famously put the point into dramatic relief with his 1939 essay Proof of an External World, in which he gave a common sense argument against skepticism by raising his right hand and saying "here is one hand," and then raising his left and saying "and here is another". Here, Moore is taking his knowledge claim (q) to be that he has two hands, and without rejecting the skeptic's premise, seeks to prove that we can know the skeptical possibility (sp) to be untrue.

Moore's argument is not simply a flippant response to the skeptic.  Moore gives, in Proof of an External World, three requirements for a good proof: (1) the premises must be different from the conclusion, (2) the premises must be demonstrated, and (3) the conclusion must follow from the premises. He claims that his proof of an external world meets those three criteria.

In his 1925 essay "A Defence of Common Sense", Moore argues against idealism and skepticism toward the external world on the grounds that skeptics could not give reasons to accept their metaphysical premises that were more plausible to him than the reasons he had to accept the common sense claims about our knowledge of the world that skeptics and idealists must deny. In other words, he is more willing to believe that he has a hand than to believe the premises of what he deems "a strange argument in a university classroom." "I do not think it is rational to be as certain of any one of these ... propositions".

Objections and replies 
Some subsequent philosophers (especially those inclined to skeptical doubts) have found Moore's method of argument unconvincing.

One form of refutation contends that Moore's attempted proof fails his second criterion for a good proof (i.e. the premises are not demonstrable in the required sense) by pointing out the difference between demonstrating the perception that his hands exist and demonstrating the knowledge that his hands exist. Moore may be doing the former when he means to be doing the latter.

Another form of refutation simply points out that not everyone shares Moore's intuition. If a person finds the skeptical possibility sp more intuitively likely than the knowledge claim q, then for that person Moore's own defense of intuition provides a basis for their skepticism.

Ludwig Wittgenstein offered a subtle objection to Moore's argument in passage #554 of On Certainty (see below). Considering "I know", he said "In its language-game it is not presumptuous ('nicht anmassend')," so that even if P implies Q, knowing P is true doesn't necessarily entail Q. Moore has displaced "I know.." from its language-game and derived a fallacy.

Legacy
Appeals of this type are subsequently often called "Moorean facts". "A Moorean fact [is] one of those things that we know better than we know the premises of any philosophical argument to the contrary".

Moore's claim to know such facts had "long interested" Ludwig Wittgenstein.
His last writings in the six weeks before his death in 1951 were an attempt to respond comprehensively to Moore's argument, the fourth time in two years he had tried to do so. His notes from the four periods were collected and translated by his literary executors and published posthumously as On Certainty in 1969.

See also
 Samuel Johnson, who is said to have kicked a rock on learning of Bishop Berkeley's denial of matter, declaring "I refute it thus!"
 Diogenes, who is said to have walked away upon hearing a philosophical argument denying the existence of motion, intending to prove without utterance that motion does indeed exist.
 In Leo Tolstoy's  War and Peace, determinism is refuted as: “You say: I am not free. But I have raised and lowered my arm. Everyone understands that this illogical answer is an irrefutable proof of freedom.”

References

External links
 Kelly, Thomas. "Moorean Facts and Belief Revision, or Can the Skeptic Win?". Princeton University, in John Hawthorne (ed.), Philosophical Perspectives, vol.19: Epistemology, 2005.

Skepticism
Concepts in epistemology